Joseph Leroy Hansen (June 16, 1910 – January 18, 1979) was an American Trotskyist and leading figure in the Socialist Workers Party.
Too many babies? a Marxist answer to some frightening questions ...  New York : Pioneer Publishers, 1960
The truth about Cuba New York, Pioneer Publishers, 1960
In defense of the Cuban revolution: an answer to the State Department and Theodore Draper. New York, Pioneer Publishers, 1961
The theory of the Cuban Revolution [New York] : Pioneer Publishers for the Socialist Workers Party, 1962
Trotskyism and the Cuban revolution: an answer to Hoy New York: Pioneer Publishers, 1962
Khrushchev's downfall. A statement by the United Secretariat of the Fourth International; New Deepening of the Sino-Soviet Rift? New York : Pioneer Publishers, 1964
Healy "reconstructs" the Fourth International documents and comments by participants in fiasco (preface) New York: Socialist Workers Party 1966
The catastrophe in Indonesia; three articles on the fatal consequences of Communist party policy. (introduction) New York: Merit Publishers 1966
Behind China's great cultural revolution by Shu-tse Peng (contributor) New York: Merit Publishers 1967
The Nature of the Cuban revolution: record of a controversy, 1960-1963 New York: National Education Dept., Socialist Workers Party 1968
Leon Trotsky: the man and his work. Reminiscences and appraisals, (contributor) New York: Merit Publishers 1969
The population explosion: how socialists view it  New York: Pathfinder Press, 1970 (revised edition of Too many babies)
The Abern clique New York: National Education Dept., Socialist Workers Party 1972
Nixon's Moscow and Peking Summits: their meaning for Vietnam (with Caroline Lund) New York: Pathfinder Press, 1972
A Revolutionary strategy for the 70s; documents of the Socialist Workers Party. (contributor) New York: Pathfinder Press, 1972
The workers and farmers government New York: National Education Dept., Socialist Workers Party 1974
Marxism vs. ultraleftism: the record of Healy's break with Trotskyism by Ernest Germain (introduction) New York: National Education Dept., Socialist Workers Party 1974
Healy's big lie: the slander campaign against Joseph Hansen, George Novack, and the Fourth International: statements and articles National Education Dept., Socialist Workers Party 1976
What is American fascism?: writings on Father Coughlin, Mayor Frank Hague, and Senator Joseph McCarthy (with James Cannon) National Education Dept., Socialist Workers Party 1976
Dynamics of the Cuban revolution: the Trotskyist view New York: Pathfinder Press, 1978
The Leninist strategy of party building: the debate on guerrilla warfare in Latin America New York: Pathfinder Press, 1979

References

External links
Joseph Hansen Archive at marxists.org.
What the Record Really Shows: The Test of the Cuban Revolution by Joseph Hansen. International Socialist Review January 1965.
Bio-bibliographical sketch of Joseph Hansen at the Lubitz TrotskyanaNet.
 
   

1910 births
1979 deaths
People from Richfield, Utah
American people of Norwegian descent
Members of the Communist League of America
Members of the Workers Party of the United States
Members of the Socialist Party of America
Members of the Socialist Workers Party (United States)
Marxist journalists